Frederick Moulton Alger Jr. (August 3, 1907January 7, 1967) was an American politician and diplomat.

Early life
Alger was born on August 3, 1907, to parents Frederick Moulton and Mary Eldridge Alger in Detroit, Michigan. He was a grandson of Russell A. Alger.

Military career
Alger served in the United States Navy during World War II.

Political career
Alger unsuccessfully ran for the position of United States Representative from Michigan's 14th District in 1936. He received 34.4% of the vote. Alger served as the Michigan Secretary of State from 1947 to 1952. In 1950, Alger ran in the Michigan gubernatorial Republican primary unsuccessfully. Alger was the Republican nominee in the 1952 Michigan gubernatorial election, but was again unsuccessful.

Diplomatic career
Alger was appointed to the position of United States Ambassador to Belgium by President Dwight D. Eisenhower on May 26, 1953. The presentation of his credentials occurred on July 22, 1953. The termination of mission occurred on March 27, 1957.

Personal life
Alger married Suzette de Marigny Dewey in 1929. He was widowed in 1963. Later in the year, he married Katherine Sutton. Alger was a member of a number of organizations including the American Legion, the Elks, the Sons of the American Revolution, Veterans of Foreign Wars, Military Order of the World Wars, and was a Freemason. Alger was Presbyterian.

Death
Alger died on January 7, 1967, in Grosse Pointe, Michigan.

References

1907 births
1967 deaths
Ambassadors of the United States to Belgium
American Freemasons
Presbyterians from Michigan
20th-century Presbyterians
Secretaries of State of Michigan
Michigan Republicans
Politicians from Detroit
Military personnel from Michigan
United States Navy personnel of World War II
20th-century American politicians
20th-century American diplomats